William Thomas Brandon (25 May 1893 – 1 May 1956) was an English footballer who played in the Football League for Bradford Park Avenue, Hull City and Wigan Borough. His father of the same name was a professional footballer (and a Scottish international) and several uncles also played the game, including FA Cup winner Harry Brandon.

References

1893 births
1956 deaths
English footballers
Association football defenders
English Football League players
Blackburn Rovers F.C. players
Rossendale United F.C. players
Darwen F.C. players
South Liverpool F.C. players
West Ham United F.C. players
Bristol Rovers F.C. players
Hull City A.F.C. players
Bradford (Park Avenue) A.F.C. players
Wigan Borough F.C. players
English people of Scottish descent
Footballers from Blackburn